The Late Show with Stephen Colbert is an American late-night news and liberal  political satire talk show hosted by Stephen Colbert, which premiered on September 8, 2015. Produced by Spartina Productions and CBS Studios, it is the second iteration of CBS' Late Show franchise. The program is taped at the Ed Sullivan Theater in New York City and airs live to tape in most U.S. markets weeknights at 11:35p.m. ET/PT, as with its competitors Jimmy Kimmel Live! and The Tonight Show Starring Jimmy Fallon.

Colbert was announced as the new host in April 2014, after existing host David Letterman announced his intention to retire earlier in the month; Colbert had previously hosted Comedy Central's news satire The Colbert Report, a program where Colbert portrayed himself as a parody of conservative pundits. As such, the series has carried a stronger focus on discussing and satirizing current events, especially within U.S. politics. Some of Colbert's staff moved to The Late Show, along with Jon Stewartwho previously hosted The Colbert Reports parent series The Daily Showserving as an executive producer.

As of the conclusion of the 2019–2020 season, The Late Show with Stephen Colbert has been the top late-night program in the United States for the past four seasons. Since 2019, it exceeded The Tonight Show in key demographic viewership.

Background
Prior to Colbert's assumption of hosting duties, David Letterman had been host of Late Show for 22 years, dating to his arrival at CBS in 1993. CBS had not had a regular late-night talk show for most of its existence before that point, with only one attempt (the short-lived Pat Sajak Show in 1989–1990) between 1972 and Letterman's arrival. Letterman, who joined CBS from NBC after ending his eleven-year run as host of Late Night and losing out on being Johnny Carson's successor on The Tonight Show to Jay Leno, was initially competitive with his show's bitter rival, The Tonight Show with Jay Leno; Letterman's Late Show, however, slowly experienced a decline in ratings over the course of the 1990s and 2000s, dating back to an affiliation agreement between New World Communications and Fox that resulted in all nine CBS-affiliated stations it owned or recently acquired switching to Fox between September and December 1994, relegating the network to lower-rated former Fox affiliates and independent stations in many major cities.

According to TV by the Numbers, in February 2013, the live-plus-seven-day ratings for Letterman's Late Show averaged about 3.1 million per show for the 2012–2013 season to date. A year later, average viewership was down to 2.8 million. Late Show also had the oldest audience among the various late-night talk shows, which may have led to CBS' decision to pick a younger replacement for Letterman to compete with The Tonight Show Starring Jimmy Fallon and ABC's Jimmy Kimmel Live!. In addition, Colbert's previous program did well among college students and young men 18–34, which are prime target audiences for late-night comedy programming.

On April 3, 2014, Letterman announced his retirement, with his final episode as host of Late Show scheduled for May 20, 2015. On April 10, 2014, CBS announced Stephen Colbert as Letterman's successor, signing him to a five-year agreement. In contrast with Colbert's previous program The Colbert Report, in which he played a fictionalized version of himself, Colbert hosts the show as himself. Colbert's version retains the Late Show name under license from Letterman's Worldwide Pants, which holds the registered trademark. On April 23, 2014, the character version of Stephen Colbert appeared on The Daily Show with Jon Stewart to announce that he had clearly "won television" and would be closing down The Colbert Report because he had met his goal. This came after the announcement the character would not be used after the end of The Colbert Report. The final episode of Report aired on December 18, 2014.

Several states and municipalities attempted to coax CBS with tax credits and other incentives to move Late Show from its long-time home at the Ed Sullivan Theater in New York City, including Connecticut, Los Angeles, and New Orleans. On July 23, 2014, CBS CEO Les Moonves announced that the program would remain in New York City; CBS would be eligible for $11 million in tax credits over five years to produce the program there, and would also receive grants to fund renovations to the theater. Jon Batiste was announced as the bandleader on June 4, 2015, with his Stay Human band succeeding the CBS Orchestra (which returned to its previous identity as the World's Most Dangerous Band shortly thereafter) as the house band.

Promotion
In anticipation of the program's premiere, a new online presence was launched for The Late Show in June 2015, including new social media accounts, a podcast, mobile app, and a monologue-styled video focusing on the beard Colbert had grown since leaving The Colbert Report. Throughout the remainder of the summer, videos would continue to be released through the show's official YouTube channel and mobile app. On July 1, 2015, Colbert hosted a special edition of a public access program in Monroe, Michigan, interviewing Eminem.

Production

Colbert has been given near-full control of the show, with little interference from CBS management in regard to format. Colbert brought most of his staff from The Colbert Report with him to The Late Show, as well as outsiders such as Brian Stack, who is best known for his work on Conan O'Brien's programs, and Jon Stewart, former host of Colbert's previous sister program The Daily Show, who is credited as executive producer. Colbert no longer uses the character he had portrayed on The Colbert Report, jokingly remarking to Jeb Bush that "I used to play a narcissistic conservative punditnow I'm just a narcissist."

The Ed Sullivan Theater underwent a full restoration to its original 1927 appearance, a process that began following Letterman's final episode, including the uncovering of the theater's ceiling, stained-glass windows and a restoration of a chandelier, due to advances in technology that allow less sound and video equipment to cover up the auditorium's architectural details. The 1993 restoration project for Letterman was done on only a few months' notice after the theater was repurchased in February 1993 by CBS.

On April 13, 2016, former CBS This Morning executive producer Chris Licht was named showrunner for The Late Show; CBS had shown concerns that, despite improved ratings in comparison to Letterman's tenure, Colbert had a weak online presence in comparison to The Tonight Show Starring Jimmy Fallon, and Colbert's lead-out The Late Late Show with James Corden (whose "Carpool Karaoke" segments have been popular as viral videos). The Hollywood Reporter believed that Licht's experience in news programming would be leveraged to complement Colbert's strengths in topical and news-oriented material.

On October 17, 2019, Colbert and CBS announced that they had agreed to renew his contract, which has been set to expire in August 2020, until August 2023.

On March 12, 2020, the show suspended production due to the COVID-19 pandemic in the United States. Beginning March 30, 2020, the show was produced from Colbert's home, billed as A Late Show with Stephen Colbert (or A Late Show with Stephen at Home). ViacomCBS announced that the show would return to the Ed Sullivan Theater on August 6 with in-studio episodes starting on August 10, 2020. Colbert presented the program from a smaller set within the building's office tower, built as a replica of his own personal office seen on A Late Show with Stephen Colbert.

On August 4, 2020, the show's music producer Giovanni Cianci was fired following sexual misconduct allegations.

On May 24, 2021, Colbert announced that the show would resume production inside the theater with an audience fully vaccinated against COVID-19 starting on June 14, 2021. It was also announced that the Ed Sullivan Theater would be back at full capacity, following the lifting of COVID-19 guidelines that restricted the number of people in a crowded, indoor setting. The announcement was significant in that the Ed Sullivan Theater would become the first theater on Broadway to reopen to full capacity. It also made The Late Show the first late-night talk show to announce a return to a full audience, though The Tonight Show ultimately returned to full-capacity audiences one week ahead of The Late Show on June 7, 2021. With the show's return to the theater, the original name was also put back in use.

The program's intro originally used tilt–shift photography featuring scenes of New York City, making the city appear like a miniature model. In September 2021 The Late Show introduced a new intro sequence, featuring the use of a drone camera flying around the theater and its backstage areas.

On February 26, 2022, Chris Licht, the showrunner, left the show to become the new chairman and CEO of CNN.

Format

Colbert originally started the show with a cold open and brief monologue before the opening sequence. Starting with the April 18, 2016, broadcast, the first under new showrunner Chris Licht, the format was modified to replace the cold open monologue with short sketches starring Colbert, his staff, and often featuring that night's guests, followed by the opening sequence and Colbert entering the stage. For the first few weeks of the show, Colbert performed his own voiceovers for the intro. The intro is now voiced over by Jen Spyra.

The open is followed by an extended news satire style desk sequence with a run-through of recent headlines, in a manner reminiscent of television newscasts and that of The Colbert Report. Also, the show follows the same basic format as other late-night talk shows including the use of sketch comedy, guest interviews and musical performances. Colbert's guest list includes more political and government figures than his contemporaries; his first two weeks' guests included visits from Jeb Bush, Joe Biden, Ban Ki-moon, Stephen Breyer, Bernie Sanders, Elizabeth Warren, Donald Trump, and Ted Cruz.

Thus far, Colbert has not had any of his staff act as a sidekick or straight man on the show. While Colbert dances and physically interacts with Jon Batiste while the band plays, they only occasionally engage in on-air banter, unlike David Letterman's relationship with Paul Shaffer or the relationship of other late night hosts with their announcers or bandleaders. On the August 11, 2022, episode, Colbert announced that Batiste had decided he would not be returning to the show, in order to "pursue personal and professional interests". After the first few episodes in which Colbert introduced himself, he has used an off-screen announcerwriter Jen Spyra. Occasionally, Colbert has brought out producers of his show, or enlisted the help of audience members, who assume a sidekick-like role for single segments, engaging in light dialogue about a topic.

The show has occasionally been broadcast live to provide coverage of the immediate aftermath of major political events, such as candidate debates and party conventions during election years, the State of the Union address, in the 2018 mid-term elections and the 2020 US presidential election.

Episodes

Notable episodes
In the show's series premiere, Colbert welcomed actor George Clooney and politician Jeb Bush, thanked former host David Letterman, and joined singer Mavis Staples and numerous other musicians for a rendition of Sly and the Family Stone's "Everyday People". The episode nearly missed its broadcast due to technical difficulties. An early interview with Vice President Joe Biden received particular acclaim.

Following the terrorist attacks in Paris that November, Colbert devoted his program to that city. A special football-themed episode aired as the lead-out program for Super Bowl 50 in 2016, featuring guests President Barack Obama (in a taped segment), Tina Fey, Margot Robbie, Will Ferrell, and Megyn Kelly.

On June 22, 2016, CBS announced that The Late Show would broadcast two weeks of live episodes during the 2016 Republican and Democratic conventions. The first of these episodes, on July 18, 2016, opened with a musical number by Colbert that compared the Republican convention to being "Christmas in July", and featured sketches where Jon Stewart (revealed to have been living off-grid in a cabin) is told that Donald Trump had clinched the Republican nomination for the presidential election, Colbert's persona from The Colbert Report is revived and delivers an edition of The Word on "Trumpiness", and a filmed sketch touring the convention's venue as his The Hunger Games-inspired character Julius Flickerman. Stewart appeared once more the following Thursday, delivering a segment criticizing the Fox News Channel in the wake of the firing of its CEO Roger Ailes. Colbert's performances during these episodes were critically praised for their return to an emphasis on news-oriented comedy similar to The Colbert Report and The Daily Show.

On November 8, 2016, Colbert presented a live, election night special for CBS's sister premium channel Showtime, Stephen Colbert's Live Election Night: Democracy's Series Finale: Who's Going to Clean Up This Shit? The special featured appearances by Laura Benanti (reprising her impersonation of Melania Trump), Jeff Goldblum, Mark Halperin, Elle King, John Heilemann, and Nick Offerman. Due to it being broadcast on a premium channel, the show was billed as being uncensored (which Colbert demonstrated during his monologue by swearing, and announcing Marco Rubio's Senate re-election result using a nearly-nude model). Critics felt that the special had anticipated a Hillary Clinton victory, noting the increasingly "surreal" and "uncomfortable" atmosphere that ensued when Trump emerged as the front-runner. When Halperin informed Colbert that Trump was nearing the required 270 electoral votes, he remarked that he "[couldn't] put a happy face on it, and that's my job." Katy Perry was expected to make a pre-recorded appearance, but her segment was dropped due to the impending victory. During his interview, Jeff Goldblum also acknowledged the situation, and sang a verse from "It Goes Like It Goes". In his closing monologue, Colbert noted that before she died, his mother Lorna (who was born only days after the first presidential election where women had the right to vote nationally) remarked thatdespite having historically been a Republicanshe had wanted to vote for Hillary Clinton. He argued that people may have "overdosed" on the "poison" of politics, but acknowledged that "you can't laugh and be afraid at the same time, and the devil cannot stand mockery." Another abandoned gag from the special was, had Clinton won, Colbert would have brought out nude models with the letters "W-E-'-R-E W-I-T-H H-E-R" printed on their butt cheeks. When it became clear that Trump was going to win, they initially thought of changing the lettering to "W-E-'-R-E S-C-R-E-W-E-D", before it was decided not to use the gag.

On May 1, 2017, Colbert's monologue was devoted to President Trump following his conduct in an interview with CBS's John Dickerson on Face the Nation. Describing Dickerson as a fellow "member of the CBS family", Colbert "read a laundry list of insults on-air to rapturous cheers from the crowd... reeling off a series of scripted jokes and ending on, 'In fact, the only thing your mouth is good for is being Vladimir Putin's cock holster.'" Colbert's language was considered to be crude and homophobic by some, and led to a short-lived #FireColbert hashtag on Twitter. Colbert later addressed the controversy on-air, admitting he had used "a few words that were cruder than they needed to be" but that he "would do [the monologue] again". On May 5, the Federal Communications Commission announced that it would go through a comprehensive investigation of Colbert's remarks, and concluded no action was to be taken against Colbert or The Late Show, reasoning in a public statement released on May 23 that there was "nothing actionable under the FCC's rules" as the offending statement had been properly censored.

On November 3, 2020, Colbert produced his second Showtime election special, Stephen Colbert's Election Night 2020: Democracy's Last Stand: Building Back America Great Again Better 2020. Ahead of the special, showrunner Chris Licht told The Hollywood Reporters TV's Top 5 podcast that the show would be prepared for every eventuality. The special featured many of the same guests who had attended the 2016 election night special, notably Charlemagne tha God; unlike the 2016 show, the prolonged nature of the election projections in 2020 meant that Colbert could not reasonably prognosticate on a winner during the live showAmericans would not know the winner until later in the week. The special won the 2021 Emmy Award for Outstanding Variety Special (Live).

Reception

Ratings and viewership
The Late Show debuted to 8.26 million viewers (with Live+7) according to Nielsen Media Research, beating out all late-night competition. The show's highest ratings to dateand highest for the Late Show franchisewere achieved by a live episode that ran after Super Bowl 50 in 2016, which averaged 21.1 million viewers. Despite this, the show's initial ratings trailed competitor The Tonight Show Starring Jimmy Fallon, while remaining ahead of Jimmy Kimmel Live. While Colbert still managed more young viewers than Letterman in his first few months, analyst Bill Carter wrote that his "opening splash seemed to dry faster than expected." He suggested this was due to little social media presence (where his competitor, Fallon, surged). After Chris Licht was brought on as showrunner, the show began to increasingly focus more extensively on politics and the 2016 U.S. presidential election, including several live episodes following the 2016 Republican National Convention. While the live episodes saw gains, The Tonight Show remained the top late-night program.

Following the inauguration of Donald Trump as president in January 2017, The Late Show began to see major ratings gains, aided by the program's satire of the Trump administration. In the first full week after the inauguration, Colbert narrowly beat Fallon for the first time in average viewership since its premiere. By the end of April, The Late Show had been the top U.S. late-night program in terms of total viewership for sixteen consecutive weeks and was rated the number one late night show by viewership for the first quarter of 2017. The Late Show became the highest-rated late-night talk show for the September 2016 to May 2017 season, averaging more than 3.2 million nightly viewers.

The show has since seen larger ratings gains; in the first quarter of 2018, the show saw 4.02 million DVR-adjusted viewers, which was a twenty percent leap over the same time frame a year before. In the 2018–2019 television season, The Late Show was the highest-rated U.S. late-night talk show for a third consecutive season. In addition, for the first time in Colbert's tenure, and the first time in franchise history since the 1994–1995 season, The Late Show narrowly beat The Tonight Show as the top late-night show among viewers in the key demographic of adults 18–49. The Late Show was the most-watched late-night program during the 2019–2020 season, according to the Nielsen ratings, with an average of 3.6 million viewers.

Reviews
The Late Show with Stephen Colbert has garnered mostly positive reviews. The Guardian Brian Moylan praised the show's humor: "This opener was by no means a perfect show, but there were enough really inventive jokes to make Colbert already seem like an innovator." Robert Lloyd of Los Angeles Times deemed it a "strong start", while Variety Brian Lowry felt it a "mostly terrific" debut, commenting, "Colbert looks like he has the skill set to settle in and make this job his own, night in and night out." Many critics considered the show's more political segments as reminiscent of The Colbert Report. An early interview with then Vice President Joe Biden also received praise: Robert Rorke of the New York Post commented that the review gave Biden "that essential sense of humanity that makes people believe in a candidate".

The show's post-Super Bowl episode in 2016 proved polarizing. "Sunday's live episode felt mostly like a wasted opportunityone that probably won't win many converts among those football fans sober enough to stick around," said Brian Lowry at Variety. Daniel D'Addario of Time dubbed his performance "stiff and uncomfortable", writing, "Colbert might have been better advised not to bother trying with football at all and just put forward a program of pure entertainment."

The Late Show has received positive reviews following the inauguration of Donald Trump as president. "Colbert may not be the sarcastic, irony-laden character he once played for Comedy Central, but as Trump has dominated the news every day since taking office, The Late Show has become the home for reasoned, but incisive, discussion, on the perceived overreaches of the White House," said David Sims of The Atlantic. James Poniewozik of The New York Times commented, "Mr. Colbert's comedy hasn't become radically different, but it has been more frank and caustic... The network-TV Mr. Colbert is more cheery than his cable character. But it's as if the Trump administration had solved the problem of reconciling his new comedy with his old by making truthiness America's official language."

Accolades
The show was a recipient for the Peabody Award and earned Primetime Emmy Award nominations including four times for Outstanding Variety Talk Series.

International broadcasts
In Canada, The Late Show with Stephen Colbert airs on Global, airing in simulcast with CBS in most regions. NTV, another Canadian station, also simulcasts Global's broadcast to Newfoundland as well as The Bahamas and Saint Pierre and Miquelon.

In Australia, The Late Show with Stephen Colbert airs on Network 10 (a sister ViacomCBS network).

In Southeast Asia, The Late Show with Stephen Colbert airs on RTL CBS Entertainment weeknights at 10:50pm (UTC+08:00) starting September 10, 2015, preceding The Late Late Show with James Corden.

In India and Sri Lanka, The Late Show with Stephen Colbert airs on STAR World Premiere HD.

In Portugal, The Late Show with Stephen Colbert airs on SIC Radical.

In New Zealand, it airs on free to air Prime at late night times.

In Germany, The Late Show with Stephen Colbert airs since January 2020 on Sat.1 Emotions.

In South Africa the show airs at 11:00pm Monday–Thursday, and Friday nights at midnight, on free-to-air e.tv, since October 2019.

The American Forces Network satellite radio and television service broadcasts the show commercial free to United States military personnel stationed overseas on Prime Atlantic for viewers in Europe and on Prime Pacific for viewers in Asia.

See also
Whose Boat Is This Boat?, a satirical children's book produced by The Late Show, based on quotations from Donald Trump

References

External links

 
2015 American television series debuts
2010s American political comedy television series
2010s American satirical television series
2010s American sketch comedy television series
2010s American late-night television series
2010s American variety television series
2010s American television news shows
2020s American political comedy television series
2020s American satirical television series
2020s American sketch comedy television series
2020s American late-night television series
2020s American variety television series
2020s American television news shows
American news parodies
American television shows featuring puppetry
CBS original programming
English-language television shows
The Late Show (franchise)
Peabody Award-winning television programs
Political satirical television series
Stephen Colbert
Super Bowl lead-out shows
Television series by CBS Studios
Television shows filmed in New York City